The Rockfish River is a  tributary of the James River in central Virginia in the United States.  Via the James River, it is part of the watershed of the Chesapeake Bay.

Course
The Rockfish River is formed in Nelson County, Virginia, by the confluence of its North and South Forks, both of which rise in the Blue Ridge Mountains near the Blue Ridge Parkway. It flows generally southeastwardly through northern Nelson County; in its lower course the river is used to define the boundary between Nelson and Albemarle counties.

Etymology
Rockfish Valley is named for the fact that before the dams on the James River were constructed, rockfish ran from the bays as far west as the valley.

See also
List of Virginia rivers

Sources

Columbia Gazetteer of North America entry
DeLorme (2005).  Virginia Atlas & Gazetteer.  Yarmouth, Maine: DeLorme.  .

Rivers of Virginia
Tributaries of the James River
Rivers of Albemarle County, Virginia
Rivers of Nelson County, Virginia